is an overseas campus of Teikyo University located on the campus of Durham University in the Lafcadio Hearn Culture Centre. The campus was established in 1990 and operates as a language and cultural exchange facility for students from Teikyo University in Tokyo.

The university runs a six-month English language exchange program. Students live either in one of two Japanese Halls of Residence or in accommodation at St Mary's College - a college of Durham University.

The university hosts various outreach activities such as an annual 'Japanese Festival', a schools liaison program and its Japanese library is open to Durham University staff and students along with members of the local community on a part-time basis.

References

International universities
Japanese international schools in the United Kingdom
1990 establishments in England
Durham University